In mathematics, a quasiperiodic function is a function that has a certain similarity to a periodic function. What it means to be "simpler" is vague.

A simple case (sometimes called arithmetic quasiperiodic) is if the function obeys the equation:

Another case (sometimes called geometric quasiperiodic) is if the function obeys the equation:

An example of this is the Jacobi theta function, where

shows that for fixed  it has quasiperiod ; it also is periodic with period one. Another example is provided by the Weierstrass sigma function, which is quasiperiodic in two independent quasiperiods, the periods of the corresponding Weierstrass ℘ function.

Functions with an additive functional equation

are also called quasiperiodic. An example of this is the Weierstrass zeta function, where

for a z-independent η when ω is a period of the corresponding Weierstrass ℘ function.

In the special case where  we say f is periodic with period ω in the period lattice .

Quasiperiodic signals

Quasiperiodic signals in the sense of audio processing are not quasiperiodic functions in the sense defined here; instead they have the nature of almost periodic functions and that article should be consulted. The more vague and general notion of quasiperiodicity has even less to do with quasiperiodic functions in the mathematical sense.

A useful example is the function:

If the ratio A/B is rational, this will have a true period, but if A/B is irrational there is no true period, but a succession of increasingly accurate "almost" periods.

See also 
 Quasiperiodic motion

References

External links
Quasiperiodic function at PlanetMath

Complex analysis
Types of functions